The Metropolitan Handicap, frequently called the "Met Mile",  is an American Grade I Thoroughbred horse race held at Belmont Park in Elmont, New York. Open to horses age three and older, it is contested on dirt over a distance of one mile (8 furlongs). Starting in 2014, it is now run on the same day as the Belmont Stakes in early June.

The Met Mile is one of the most prestigious American races outside of the Triple Crown and Breeders' Cup. It is known as a "stallion-making race" as the distance of a mile often displays the winner's "brilliance", referring to an exceptional turn of foot. Winners of the race who went on to become notable stallions include Tom Fool (1953), Native Dancer (1954), Buckpasser (1967), Fappiano (1981), Gulch (1987–88), and Ghostzapper (2005).

History

The Met Mile was first run in 1891 at Morris Park Racetrack. Prior to 1897, it was run at a distance of  miles.  In 1904, its location was moved to Belmont Park.  There it remained except for nine years; 1960 to 1967, 1969, and 1975 when it was hosted by Aqueduct Racetrack.  It was not run in 1895, 1911, and 1912.

The Met Mile was the first of three races in the New York Handicap Triple series, followed by the Suburban Handicap and Brooklyn Handicap. Four horses have won the Handicap Triple:
 Whisk Broom II (1913)
 Tom Fool (1953)
 Kelso (1961)
 Fit to Fight (1984)

The Met Mile and the Brooklyn are now run on the same day as part of the Belmont Stakes undercard, so it is no longer possible to complete the Handicap Triple.

There was a Dead Heat for first in 1905.

Records
Time record: 
 1:32.73 – Frosted (2016)

Largest Margin
 14 1/4  – Frosted (2016)
Most wins by an owner
 6 – Greentree Stable (1940, 1943, 1944, 1945, 1953, 1963)

Most wins by a jockey
 5 – John Velazquez (1996, 1999, 2010, 2012, 2014)

Most wins by a trainer
 6 – John M. Gaver Sr. (1940, 1943, 1944, 1945, 1953, 1963)

Winners

See also 
 Metropolitan Handicap top three finishers and starters

References

 The 2008 Metropolitan Handicap at the NTRA

External links
 Ten Things You Should Know About the Met Mile at Hello Race Fans!

Grade 1 stakes races in the United States
Horse races in New York (state)
Open mile category horse races
Belmont Park
Morris Park Racecourse
Recurring sporting events established in 1891
1891 establishments in New York (state)